Fussball Club Triesenberg is a Liechtensteiner amateur football team that plays in Triesenberg, Liechtenstein. It is one of the seven official teams in the nation.  They play in the Swiss Football League in 3. Liga, which is the seventh tier. The team annually competes in the Liechtensteiner Cup. The club has never won the tournament, but was the runner-up in the 2014–2015 edition.

History 
The team was founded in 1972. Like all the other teams in Liechtenstein they started playing in the Swiss leagues, in this case in 4. Liga. They achieved promotion for the first time in their history in the 1986/1987 season, being promoted to 3. Liga. They stayed in that league till 1998, when they were relegated. In 2001 they were promoted back to 3. Liga and in 2010 were promoted to 2. Liga.

Honours 
Liechtenstein Football Cup
Runners-up (1): 2015

Current squad

External links 
Official Site

 
Football clubs in Liechtenstein
Expatriated football clubs
1972 establishments in Liechtenstein